Calophyllum novoguineense is a species of flowering plant in the Calophyllaceae family. It is found in West Papua (Indonesia) and Papua New Guinea.

References

novoguineense
Flora of Papua New Guinea
Flora of Western New Guinea
Least concern plants
Taxonomy articles created by Polbot
Plants described in 1942